"The Horns" is a 2015 song by DJ Katch. The remix version of the song features Greg Nice, DJ Kool and Deborah Lee.

Music video
The music video was uploaded on November 17, 2015 by WePLAY Music and Management.

Track listing

Charts

References

2015 songs
2016 singles
Songs written by Freedo (producer)